The Renault Fluence is a compact sedan produced by the French automaker Renault. The car was produced until 2016 at the Oyak-Renault plant in Bursa, Turkey. It was produced until the end of 2018 in Santa Isabel, Argentina, for the Latin American market. Its electric version is still produced in Busan, South Korea, for the market of the Asia-Pacific.

On 12 July 2016, Renault unveiled the successor to the Fluence, initially for the market of Europe, the Mégane Sedan IV.

Design 

Revealed in August 2009, the Fluence is based on the Renault/Nissan C platform, but it is sized between the compact family saloon C segment, and the upper medium segment.

The Mégane range featured a "three box" notchback sedan variant until the end of 2008, but this was never a big seller and when, at the end of that year, the Mégane III was introduced, there was no notchback version available. 

The gap in the range left by the removal of the saloon model from the FrancoSpanish assembled Mégane range was filled by the Fluence in markets such as France, Italy, Belgium, Ireland and - from August 2010, Germany. 

The Renault Fluence is also badged as Renault Samsung SM3. The Renault Samsung car was first presented at the Seoul Motor Show in April 2009, and the rebadged Renault Fluence went on sale in November 2009. The model has first been offered with two petrol engines: a 1.6 litre  and a two-litre  that can get an optional CVT. 

A Renault Sport version has been offered in Argentina and Brazil, named Fluence GT, using a 2.0 litre  engine named Renault TCe 180 mated to a 6-speed manual gearbox.

Facelift 
As of 2012, the Renault Fluence was facelifted, unveiled during the Istanbul Motor Show; with the new Renault corporate grille, standard projector style headlights and a few minor changes. In 2015, the facelifted model was advertised with a new light cluster at the rear, including LED brake lights.

Worldwide release

Middle East & North Africa 
The Renault Fluence went on sale in the GCC countries such as the United Arab Emirates as a 2011 model. Imported from Korea, there are two engines available, the 1.6 litre with a manual or CVT, and a 2.0 litre with a CVT.
Some countries of the region such as Algeria and Israel are importing the model from Turkey.

Egypt 
Renault–Nissan group put the HR16DE engine in the Fluence imported to Egypt with the facelift starting from the 2nd half of 2013 till the final production year 2017, which produces  connected to a CVT gearbox, the same drive train in Nissan Sentra for the same period.

China 
From 2009, Renault offers a Korea-sourced Fluence in China.

Latin America 
In Mexico and Chile, Renault sells the Korea-sourced Fluence. Its three trim levels use a 2.0 L engine with an option of a manual six speed gearbox or automatic CVT transmission.
In Argentina and Brazil, Renault is selling a locally-produced model. Manufactured in Santa Isabel (Argentina), its design is close to the European Fluence.

Safety
The Fluence in its most basic Latin American configuration received 4 stars for adult occupants and 2 stars for infants from Latin NCAP in 2012.

Malaysia 
The Fluence is assembled in Malaysia by TC Euro Car. It is equipped with a 2.0-litre engine and the automatic CVT transmission.

Fluence Z.E. 

Renault revealed an electric version of the Fluence at the 2009 Frankfurt Motor Show.
This is one of the vehicles in the Renault Z.E. program of electric vehicles. At the same show, the Israeli company Better Place announced the Renault Fluence Z.E. would be the first electric car with a switchable battery available on the network of battery swap charging stations that it is developing in Israel.

Sales of the Fluence Z.E. are scheduled for 2011 in Israel, Denmark and the rest of Europe, and for 2012 in the rest of the world such as Asia. 

At the end of 2013, Renault announced that the Fluence Z.E. ceased to be manufactured in Turkey. It is produced with the Renault Samsung badge for the Asia and Pacific region only.

Fluence GT 

In November 2012, Renault presented a new version of the Fluence in partnership with engineers from Renault Sport from France, as well as engineers from Brazil and Argentina. 

The project focus was to offer the first Renault Sport product developed out of France to enthusiasts and customers who were looking for something more than the available mid-range sedans until that date for Brazil and Argentina markets, notably customers who were willing to have more performance without compromising final price budget.

Based on the Privilège version, with all equipment and options, the GT version received special attention to suspension (springs and dampers) and the same engine and gearbox offered in the Megane GT for Europe.

The engine has a displacement of 1998 cc, with a bore of 82.7 mm and stroke of 93 mm. Compression ratio is 9,5:1. It features sequential multipoint fuel injection. The engine weighs approx.  and has pistons, linking rods and crankshaft reinforced, nitrile-cooled exhaust valves. The turbo is a Mitsubishi TD04-10T, wastegate twin-scroll unit to reduce lag.

The gearbox is a Pk4 17, six speed manual, three shaft synchronized, hydraulic actuated unit that weighs . The interior received a digital speedometer, leather sport seats and aluminium pedals.

It was produced from November 2012 until July 2014 in the project of Phase 1. Later, there was a project Phase 2 designated Fluence GT2, but it was only offered in Argentina. There are three external colours available: "Branco Glacier" (solid), "Vermelho Fogo" and "Preto Nacré" (both metallic).

Concept 

In 2004, Renault presented a 2+2 concept coupé, named Fluence and designed by then Renault chief designer Patrick le Quément, with a length similar to that of the Renault Laguna. It was shown on June 4, 2004, at the Louis Vuitton Car Elegance Classic in England, and at the Mondial de l'Automobile 2004.

The Fluence uses Valeo LED headlights that are angled according to the steering wheel position. An ingenious aspect of the Fluence's exterior design is its V shaped rear that gives access to the trunk in an unconventional way; an articulated piston mounted in the centre of the trunk lid slides the back up into the roof. The inside of the trunk is upholstered with "Margaux Red" cloth and has a volume of 396 dm³.

In the interior, every seat is fixed to a single rail; the arm rests on the doors are also fixed to a rail, and are enclosed to the adjustment of the seats. The dashboard is similar to the one of the Renault Talisman. It has a joystick so the driver can access different functions of the vehicle and view them on a retractable LCD screen.

Several brands, including Michelin and Recaro, were involved with the development of the Fluence. Michelin contributed tires with PAX technology (similar to Runflat), BS tooling manufactured the 22 inch aerodynamic alloy wheels, and Recaro developed the seats.

References

External links 

Fluence
Fluence Coupe
Production electric cars
Compact cars
Sedans
Latin NCAP small family cars
2000s cars
2010s cars
Cars introduced in 2009
Cars of Argentina
Cars of Turkey
Vehicles with CVT transmission